The Aulacidae are a small, cosmopolitan family of wasps, with two extant genera containing some 200 known species. They are primarily endoparasitoids of wood wasps (Xiphydriidae) and xylophagous beetles (Cerambycidae and Buprestidae). They are closely related to the family Gasteruptiidae, sharing the feature of having the first and second metasomal tergites fused, and having the head on a long pronotal "neck", though they are not nearly as slender and elongate as gasteruptiids, nor are their hind legs club-like, and they have more sculptured thoraces. They share the evanioid trait of having the metasoma attached very high above the hind coxae on the propodeum.

While generally rarely collected, they can be locally abundant in areas undergoing logging or forest fires. The rich fossil record of Aulacidae indicates they were quite abundant in the Mesozoic.

Fossil genera 
After.

 Vectevania Cockerell, 1922 Bembridge Marls, United Kingdom, Eocene (Priabonian)
 Hyptiogastrites Cockerell, 1917  Burmese amber, Myanmar, mid Cretaceous (Albian-Cenomanian)
 Archeofoenus Engel, 2017 Burmese amber, Myanmar
 Protofoenus Cockerell, 1917 Burmese amber, Myanmar
 Electrofoenops Engel, 2017 Burmese amber, Myanmar
 Electrofoenus Cockerell, 1917 Burmese amber, Myanmar
 Exilaulacus Li et al. 2018 Burmese amber, Myanmar
 Electrofeonia Jouault et al. 2020 Burmese amber, Myanmar
 Paleoaulacus Jouault and Nel, 2021 Burmese amber, Myanmar

References

Tree of Life Aulacidae
Catalogus Evaniidorum

Further reading
Jennings, J.T. & Austin, A.D. 2004, Biology and host relationships of aulacid and gasteruptiid wasps (Hymenoptera: Evanioidea): a review. In: Rajmohana, K., Sudheer, K., Girish Kumar, P., & Santhosh, S. (Eds) Perspectives on Biosystematics and Biodiversity. (University of Calicut, Kerala, India), pp. 187–215.
Turrisi, G.F., Jennings, J.T. & Vilhelmsen, L. 2009, Phylogeny and generic concepts in the parasitoid wasp family Aulacidae (Hymenoptera: Evanioidea). Invertebrate Systematics 23, 27–59.

Evanioidea